(27 January 1895 - 21 October 1976) was a Japanese scholar of Buddhism, and former president of Otani University. He was born in Kyoto.

From 1927 to 1929, Yamaguchi studied in France, concentrating on the Sanskrit and Tibetan languages. He also conducted research on the Tibetan Tripitaka of Mahâyâna Buddhism. In 1933 he became Professor of Otani University, of which he was from 1950 to 1958 president and later Professor Emeritus. He was also at one time a professor at Kyoto Sangyo University. He received the Purple Ribbon in 1962, the title of prominent cultural personality in 1964, Japanese academician in 1965, and Director of the Institute of Buddhist teachings and research branch of the Shin Otani (Pure Land Buddhism).

In its proposal, the Suzuki Foundation for Cultural Research published between 1955 and 1961, photographic facsimiles of Tibetan Tripitaka Beijing version, and "Studies of Tibetan Buddhism" on Mahâyâna Buddhism in India after Tibetan-language documents.

1895 births
1976 deaths
Academic staff of Ōtani University
Japanese scholars of Buddhism
Jōdo Shinshū Buddhist priests
20th-century Buddhist monks